Jim Brandon may refer to:

Jim Brandon Equestrian Centre
Jim Brandon (basketball), coach for Glasgow Rocks
Jim Brandon, who worked with James Shelby Downard
Jim Brandon (actor) in Dorm Life
Jimmy Brandon of Waikiki (band)

See also
James Brandon (disambiguation)